Victor Alanson Elliott (July 23, 1839 – February 5, 1899) was an associate justice of the Colorado Supreme Court from 1888 to 1895.

Early life
Elliott was born in Richmond, Pennsylvania on July 23, 1839. He earned a law degree at the University of Michigan at Ann Arbor.

He fought in the Civil War, achieving the rank of major, and relocated to Colorado after the war ended.

Career in Colorado
Elliott had a law practice in Denver. Following Colorado's admission to the Union in 1876, he was elected to serve as the first judge of Colorado's Second Judicial District. He was re-elected to the office in 1882, serving for almost twelve years before being elected associate justice of the supreme court.

Elliott was elected to the Supreme Court in fall 1888 and served as an associate justice from December 4, 1888, to January 1895.

Death
Elliott died on February 5, 1899, aged 59, in Denver. He is buried in Denver's Riverside Cemetery.

References

Justices of the Colorado Supreme Court
1839 births
1899 deaths
University of Michigan Law School alumni
Colorado lawyers
People from Denver
19th-century American judges
19th-century American lawyers